Neuberg may refer to:

 Neuberg (castle), a castle from the 13th century in Podhradí (Neuberg), Czech Republic
 Neuberg, Hesse, a municipality in the district Main-Kinzig-Kreis, Hesse, Germany
 Neuberg an der Mürz, a municipality in Styria, Austria
 Neuberg im Burgenland, a municipality in Burgenland, Austria
 Carl Neuberg (1877–1956), German biochemist
 Joseph Neuberg, German geometer
 Joseph Neuberg (writer) (1806–1867), German-English writer
 Neuberg formula, a method of fairly adjusting match point scores in contract bridge

See also
Neuburg (disambiguation)